The Armstrong Siddeley Lynx is a British seven-cylinder aero engine developed by Armstrong Siddeley.  Testing began in 1920 and 6,000 had been produced by 1939. In Italy Alfa Romeo built a  licensed version of this engine named the Alfa Romeo Lynx.

Variants
Lynx I
1920, .
Lynx II
1920, .
Lynx III
1924, .
Lynx IV
1929, .
Lynx IVA
1930, .
Lynx IVC
1929, .
Lynx IV(G)
1929, Geared propeller drive. 
Lynx IV(MOD)
1929, reconditioned and modified Lynx IV.
Lynx IV(S)
1928, fully supercharged.
Lynx V (Lynx Major)

1930, increased bore and stroke, name changed from Lynx V to Lynx Major then Cheetah. Effectively half a Panther
Piaggio P.II Licence production in Italy by Piaggio.

Applications

Airspeed Courier
Airspeed Envoy
Albatros L 68
Avro 504
Avro 618 Ten
Avro Avocet
Avro 641 Commodore
Avro 626
Avro 642/4m Eighteen
Avro Sea Tutor
Avro Tutor
BAT Bantam
Blackburn Lincock
Boulton Paul Bittern
Canadian Vickers Vanessa
Canadian Vickers Varuna
Canadian Vickers Vedette
Cierva C.8
de Havilland Hawk Moth

Fairchild FC-2
Fokker C.VII
Fokker F.VIIA
Gloster Grouse
Messerschmitt M 18
Morane-Saulnier MS.230
Nieuport-Delage NiD 39
Larynx
Parnall Parasol
Raab-Katzenstein RK-26
Wackett Warrigal
Saro Cloud
Saro Cutty Sark
Supermarine Seamew
Vickers Vireo
VL Tuisku
Westland Wagtail

Alfa Romeo Lynx
Breda Ba.19
Breda Ba.25
IMAM Ro.10

Survivors
Avro Tutor, K3215, powered by a Lynx IV, flies regularly at the Shuttleworth Collection and can be viewed in the museum at other times.

Specifications (Lynx IV)

See also

References

Notes

Bibliography

 Lumsden, Alec. British Piston Engines and their Aircraft. Marlborough, Wiltshire: Airlife Publishing, 2003. .

1920s aircraft piston engines
Aircraft air-cooled radial piston engines
Lynx